Ramaperta perarmata is a species of moth of the family Tortricidae. It is found in Brazil (Santa Catarina).

References

Moths described in 2000
Euliini